The Urmeniș is a left tributary of the river Sălaj in Romania. It flows into the Sălaj in Ariniș.

References

Rivers of Romania
Rivers of Maramureș County